Anne Francis (also known as Anne Lloyd Francis; September 16, 1930 – January 2, 2011) was an American actress known for her ground-breaking roles in the science-fiction film Forbidden Planet (1956) and the television action-drama series Honey West (1965–1966). Forbidden Planet marked a first in color, big-budget, science-fiction-themed motion pictures. Nine years later, Francis challenged female stereotypes in Honey West, in which she played a perky blonde private investigator who was as quick with body slams as witty one-liners. She earned a Golden Globe Award and Emmy Award nomination for her performance.

Francis was known largely for her physical assets, including a trademark mole near her lower lip. The beauty mark was even written into the script of one of her films. In 2005, TV Guide ranked Francis at  number 18 on its "50 Sexiest Stars of All Time" list.

Early life
Francis was born in Ossining, New York, on September 16, 1930. Contrary to some sources, which erroneously claim she was born Ann Marvak (rather than Francis), her parents' marriage registration and census records from 1925 and 1930 confirm that their names were Philip Ward Francis (19001974) and Edith (née Albertson) Francis (19011995). She was their only child.

Francis entered show business as a child, working as a model at 5 years old to assist her family during the Great Depression. She made her Broadway debut at the age of 11.

Career

Motion pictures 
Francis made her first film appearance in This Time for Keeps (1947). She played supporting roles in the films So Young, So Bad (1950), Susan Slept Here (1954), and Bad Day at Black Rock (1955); her first leading role was in Blackboard Jungle (1955). Her best-known film role is that of Altaira in Forbidden Planet (1956), a science-fiction classic that was nominated for a best-effects Oscar.

Her movie roles were then confined to low-budget efforts - a call girl in Girl of the Night (1960), a scheming trophy wife in Brainstorm (1965), the role of Georgia James in Funny Girl (1968), as Jerry Lewis's wife in Hook, Line & Sinker (1969), and as co-star to a young Burt Reynolds in the adventure movie Impasse (1969). An exception was her role as lead chorine in Funny Girl (1968).

Television
When motion-picture opportunities became scarcer for Francis near the close of the 1950s, she moved - successfully - to television. 
Beginning as a guest on The Untouchables and as the title character in The Doreen Maney Story, she appeared in two episodes of The Twilight Zone ("The After Hours" and "Jess-Belle"), two episodes of Alfred Hitchcock Presents ("Hooked" and "Keep Me Company"), and three episodes of The Alfred Hitchcock Hour ("What Really Happened", "Blood Bargain", and "The Trap"). In 1961, she appeared twice in Route 66, first in "Play it Glissando" and then "A Month of Sundays". Francis appeared in two episodes of the Western series The Virginian, two episodes of Columbo ("Short Fuse" and "A Stitch in Crime") and the episode "Incident of the Shambling Man" on the CBS Western Rawhide. She was cast in an episode of Gene Kelly's drama series, Going My Way, based on the 1944 film of the same name. During 1964, she guest-starred in "Hideout" and "Rachel's Mother" in The Reporter, as well as two successive appearances in The Man from U.N.C.L.E.. She appeared in season four, episode 10 of Mission Impossible, titled "The Double Circle".

Honey West
Honey West was an action drama; the character was formally introduced in the April 21, 1965, episode of Burke's Law titled "Who Killed the Jackpot?", after which it was spun off as a series that lasted one season of 30 half-hour episodes. Honey was a shrewd, high-energy private investigator who collaborated with assistant Sam Bolt (John Ericson) in a company that was inherited from her father. At home, she cared for her pet ocelot named Bruce. 
 
The show was cancelled due to budgetary considerations, and ABC executives imported the similarly themed hit British show The Avengers.

Late television career
Francis made a guest appearance in a 1967 episode of The Fugitive and in The Invaders the same year. She guest-starred in a 1973 episode of Barnaby Jones, "Murder in the Doll's House".

At the start of the final season of My Three Sons in 1971, Francis played bowling-alley waitress Terri Dowling, who married character Laird Fergus McBain Douglas of Sithian Bridge, Scotland, and returned to his homeland as royalty. (Fred MacMurray played the dual-character roles of Steve Douglas and Fergus McBain Douglas in this four-part story arc.) She appeared twice as a guest star on Columbo, once as the manipulated lover of the murderer ("Short Fuse", 1972) and once as the murder victim ("A Stitch in Crime", 1973).

In 1974, Francis appeared as Ida, the madame of a bawdy house on the series Kung Fu in the episode "Night of the Owls, Day of the Doves".  In 1975, she appeared as Abby in an episode of Movin' On titled "The Price of Loving".  In 1976, she appeared as Lola Flynn in an episode of Wonder Woman, entitled "Beauty on Parade". In 1977, she appeared as Lieutenant Commander Gladys Hope, the head nurse in two episodes of the World War II series Baa Baa Black Sheep. She portrayed Melissa Osborne in the episode "How Do I Kill Thee?" of The Eddie Capra Mysteries in 1978.

During the 1980–81 season of Dallas, Francis had a recurring role as Arliss Cooper, the mother of Mitch and Afton Cooper. In 1982, she played the armored car-robbing mother in "In the Best of Families" episode of CHiPs. She later played Mama Jo in the first few episodes of the 1984 TV-detective series Riptide.  In that same year, she guest-starred in the premiere episode of Murder, She Wrote, credited as Anne Lloyd Francis; she went on to guest-star in two more episodes during the show's run. In December 1984 and again credited as Anne Lloyd Francis, she guest-starred in a Christmas-themed episode of The Love Boat playing the mother of Kim Lankford's character, Carol, in the storyline of "Noel's Christmas Carol".  She appeared on episodes of Matlock and The Golden Girls.

In 1996, Francis appeared in the Wings episode "The Lady Vanishes", as Vera, a 1940s gun moll-type character. In 1997, in the Home Improvement episode "A Funny Valentine", she appeared as Liddy, Tim Allen's high-school classmate's mother. She guest-starred in 1998 on The Drew Carey Show as the mother of Drew's girlfriend Nicki in the episodes "Nicki's Parents" and "Nicki's Wedding". Francis' final television acting role was in "Shadows", a 2004 episode of Without a Trace.

Personal life
Francis was married to United States Air Force pilot Bamlet Lawrence Price, Jr., from May 1952 through April 1955, and to Robert Abeloff from 1960 through 1964; she never remarried after divorcing Abeloff. 

Francis was a Democrat and supported Adlai Stevenson's campaign during the 1952 presidential election.

Francis and Abeloff had one daughter, Jane Elizabeth Abeloff (born March 21, 1962). Francis later adopted Margaret "Maggie" West in 1970, one of the first adoptions granted to an unmarried person in California.

Francis studied flying toward the end of the 1960s, eventually earning her pilot's license. 

In 1982, Francis published an autobiography, Voices from Home: An Inner Journey.  On its cover, she wrote that the book "is my spiritual exposé. It is about our essence of being, the inner workings of mind and spirit which contribute to the growth of the invisible and most important part of us." A subsequent biography titled Anne Francis: The Life and Career was written by Laura Wagner and published by McFarland & Company in 2011.

A smoker for much of her adult life, Francis said that she quit the habit in the mid-1980s, but was diagnosed with nonsmall-cell lung cancer in 2006.

Francis died from complications due to pancreatic cancer on January 2, 2011, at a retirement home in Santa Barbara, California. Her ashes were scattered in the Pacific Ocean.

Partial TV/filmography

 1947 This Time for Keeps as Bobby Soxer (uncredited)
 1948 Summer Holiday as Elsie Rand
 1948 The Pirate as Nina, Showgirl (uncredited)
 1948 Portrait of Jennie as Teenager In Art Gallery (uncredited)
 1950 So Young, So Bad as Loretta Wilson
 1951 The Whistle at Eaton Falls as Jean
 1951 Elopement as Jacqueline "Jake" Osborne
 1952 Lydia Bailey as Lydia Bailey
 1952 Dreamboat as Carol Sayre
 1953 A Lion Is in the Streets as "Flamingo" McManamee
 1954 The Rocket Man as June Brown
 1954 Susan Slept Here as Isabella Alexander
 1954 Rogue Cop as Nancy Corlane
 1955 Bad Day at Black Rock as Liz Wirth
 1955 Battle Cry as Rae
 1955 Blackboard Jungle as Anne Dadier
 1955 The Scarlet Coat as Sally Cameron
 1956 Forbidden Planet as Altaira Morbius
 1956 The Rack as Aggie Hall
 1956 The Great American Pastime as Betty Hallerton
 1957 The Hired Gun as Ellen Beldon
 1957 Don't Go Near the Water as Lieutenant Alice Tomlen
 1959 The Ten Commandments (TV movie)
 1960 The Untouchables (TV series) as Doreen Maney
 1960 The Crowded Sky as Kitty Foster
 1960 Girl of the Night as Robin "Bobbie" Williams
 1960-1961 Alfred Hitchcock Presents (TV series) as Julia Reddy / Nyla Foster
 1961 Route 66 (TV series) as Arline Simms (season two, episode one)
 1960-1963 The Twilight Zone (TV series) as Jess-Belle Stone / Marsha White
 1963-1965 Burke's Law as Suzanne Foster (season one, episode five "Who Killed Wade Walker?") /  as Honey West (season two, episode 30 "Who Killed the Jackpot?")
 1964 Death Valley Days (TV series) as Pearl Hart (episode from March 17, 1964, titled "The Last Stagecoach Robbery")
 1964 The Virginian (TV series) as Victoria Greenly
 1964 The Man From U.N.C.L.E. as Gervaise Ravel (season one, episode three "The Quadripartite Affair" and season one, episode seven "The Giuoco Piano Affair")
 1965 The Satan Bug as Ann Williams
 1965 Honey West (TV series) as Honey West
 1965 Brainstorm as Lorrie Benson
 1967 The Invaders (TV series) as Annie Rhodes (season two, episode two "The Saucer")
 1968 Funny Girl as Georgia James
 1969 More Dead Than Alive as Monica Alton
 1969 Hook, Line & Sinker as Nancy Ingersoll
 1969 Impasse as Bobby Jones
 1969 The Love God? as Lisa LaMonica
 1970 Lost Flight (TV movie) as Gina Talbott
 1970 Wild Women (TV movie) as Jean Marshek
 1970 Dan August as Gina Talbott (season one, episode one "Murder by Proxy")
 1970 The Intruders (TV movie) as Leora Garrison
 1971 The Forgotten Man (TV movie) as Marie Hardy Forrest
 1971 Steel Wreath (TV movie) as Angel
 1971 Columbo (Columbo, season one, episode "Short Fuse")
 1972 Fireball Forward (TV movie) as Helen Sawyer
 1972 Haunts of the Very Rich (TV movie) as Annette Larrier
 1972 Pancho Villa as Flo
 1972 Gunsmoke (TV Series, season-18 episode "Sarah") as Sarah 
 1973 Columbo as Nurse Sharon Martin (season two, episode "A Stitch in Crime")
 1973 Cannon as Peggy Angel (season three, episode "Murder by Proxy”)
 1973 Barnaby Jones as Miriam Woodridge (season one, episode  "Murder in a Dolls House")
 1974 Cry Panic (TV movie) as Julie
 1974 The F.B.I. Story: The FBI Versus Alvin Karpis, Public Enemy Number One (TV movie) as Colette
 1975 The Last Survivors (TV movie) as Helen Dixon
 1975 A Girl Named Sooner (TV movie) as Selma Goss
 1976 Banjo Hackett: Roamin’ Free (TV movie) as Flora Dobbs
 1976 Survive! as Anne
 1978 Little Mo (TV movie) as Sophie Fisher
 1978 Born Again as Patty Colson
 1979 The Rebels (TV movie) as Mrs. Harris
 1979 Beggarman, Thief (TV movie) as Teresa Kraler
 1980 Detour to Terror (TV movie) as Sheila
 1980 Dan August: The Jealousy Factor (TV movie) as Nina Porter
 1981 Dallas 4 episodes as Arliss Cooper
 1982 Mazes and Monsters (TV movie) as Ellie
 1983 O'Malley (TV movie) as Amanda O'Malley
 1983 Charley's Aunt (TV movie) as Donna Lucia D'Alvadorez
 1984 Riptide 6 episodes as Mama Jo
 1985 Return as Eileen Sedgeley
 1986 A Masterpiece of Murder (TV movie) as Ruth Beekman
 1987 Laguna Heat (TV movie) as Helene Long
 1987 Poor Little Rich Girl: The Barbara Hutton Story (TV movie) as Marjorie Post Hutton
 1988 My First Love (TV movie) as Terry
 1989 The Golden Girls as Trudy McMahon (1989,  season four, episode 19 "Til Death Do We Volley") 
 1990 Little Vegas as Martha
 1992 Love Can Be Murder (TV movie) as Maggie O'Brien
 1992 The Double 0 Kid as Maggie O'Brien
 1994 Burke's Law as Honey Best (season one, episode three "Who Killed Nick Hazard?")
 1995 Lover's Knot as Marian Hunter
 1996 Have You Seen My Son (TV movie) as Catherine Pritcher
 1997 Conan the Adventurer as Gagool (season one, episode nine "The Curse of Afka")
 1999 Fantasy Island as Cassie (season one, episode 13 "Heroes")
 2004 Without a Trace as Rose Atwood (season two, episode 20 "Shadows")

References

External links
 
 
 
 obituary, guardian.co.uk, January 3, 2011; accessed July 26, 2015.

1930 births
2011 deaths
Actresses from Los Angeles
Actresses from New York (state)
Actresses from Santa Barbara, California
American child actresses
American child models
American film actresses
American stage actresses
American television actresses
Best Drama Actress Golden Globe (television) winners
California Democrats
Deaths from cancer in California
Deaths from pancreatic cancer
Female models from California
Female models from New York (state)
People from Ossining, New York
New York (state) Democrats
Western (genre) film actresses
Writers from New York (state)
21st-century American women